The Movement for Dignity and Citizenship (MDyC) is  a left-wing autonomist party in the Spanish autonomous city of Ceuta.

History
The party was formed in 2014 as a split of the Caballas Coalition, led by Fatima Hamed, the first Muslim woman to lead a political group in the Assembly of Ceuta.

Electoral results

Ceuta Assembly

References

Regionalist parties in Spain
Socialist parties in Spain
Political parties in Ceuta
Political parties established in 2011
Berbers in Spain